Bridgewater is a suburb of Hobart, Tasmania. Located approximately 19 km from the Hobart CBD, it is part of the northern suburbs area of Greater Hobart.

Overview

Bridgewater is situated on the eastern shore of the Derwent River. It is a suburb of the local government area of the Municipality of Brighton. From a transport perspective, Bridgewater is one of the first suburbs encountered by visitors traveling from the state's north via the Midland Highway and the Brighton Bypass. The suburb connects to the western shore via the Bridgewater Bridge and Causeway. Bridgewater was also once home to the train station, which was used by commuters for travel into the city.

Businesses
While there have been some significant commercial ventures in Old Main Road (which is home to fast food restaurants, such as McDonald's and The Roost), Cove Hill Shopping Centre has been the central commercial area of Bridgewater for many years. Cove Hill includes a supermarket, a KFC, and several specialty stores. Developments have seen new additions to the area, such as a new bottle shop. In November 2007, a new shopping centre, called the Greenpoint Plaza, was opened on Green Point Road. The plaza includes a Woolworths supermarket, the local post office, a BWS liquor store, and four other specialty stores. The area also has one petrol station, one pub (Derwent Tavern), and a library.

Bridgewater commonly has a reputation for its low social class and is noted as a disadvantaged area. Much of this is due to the mass of public housing, mainly built in the 1970s as part of a public housing project that was operating from 1944 to 1989.
It also has one of the highest proportions of cigarette smokers in Australia.

Education
Bridgewater has three primary schools: Northern Suburbs Christian School (private), St. Paul's Primary School (Catholic), and East Derwent Primary School (public). It also has a public high school, Bridgewater High School, which includes a school farm. East Derwent Primary School is a merger of the old Greenpoint and Bridgewater Primary Schools and is on the site of the former Greenpoint school.

The State Government of Tasmania, through the Big Picture School initiative, has connected the public schools of the area together into what will be known as the "Jordan River Learning Federation", which will provide the area with K–12 public school education, through the East Derwent Primary School, Bridgewater High School, and the newly developed post year 10 education institute.

Sport and recreation
Since 2011 Bridgewater has been the home to soccer club Derwent United FC at Weily Park.

See also
 Bridgewater Jerry

References

Localities of Brighton Council (Tasmania)